Biltmore Park Town Square is an upscale new urbanist shopping center opened in mid-2009 in Asheville, North Carolina with its anchors being REI, Regal Cinemas, Barnes & Noble, with many other small shops. It was built as an outdoor "Town Center"  with store fronts on the outside. Although the center opened in 2009, the YMCA and some stores began opening as early as 2005. They are still found in this center. Stores like LOFT, Orvis, and Bette can be found here along with a large hotel onsite, the Hilton. Many restaurants are in the center, including P.F. Changs, Which Wich, Luella's Bar-B-Que, Roux, Brixx Pizza, Hickory Tavern, Coldstone Creamery, and Nine Mile. Neighborhoods were developed around the center.

Education
The small Asheville campus of Western Carolina University is located at Biltmore Park Town Square, while the main campus is located in Cullowhee, North Carolina, about 60 miles away. WCU's Asheville location focuses on educating part-time students in pursuit of professional and graduate degrees.

Anchors
Regal Cinemas
Barnes & Noble
REI
YMCA
Hilton

Junior anchors
LOFT
Orvis
Woof Gang Bakery and Grooming

References
biltmorepark.com
Three openings in Biltmore Park Town Square on ashvegas.com

External links 
biltmorepark.com

Buildings and structures in Asheville, North Carolina
Shopping malls in North Carolina
Shopping malls established in 2009
Tourist attractions in Asheville, North Carolina